Rayfoun (also spelled Reifun or Raifoun) is a village and municipality located in the Keserwan District of the  Keserwan-Jbeil Governorate of Lebanon. It has an average elevation of 1,050 meters above sea level and a total land area of 189 hectares. 
Rayfoun's inhabitants are predominantly Maronites. Rayfoun is the hometown of Maronite Patriarch Nasrallah Boutros Sfeir and the Ottoman-era peasant leader Tanyus Shahin.

References

Populated places in Keserwan District
Maronite Christian communities in Lebanon